Sir Nicholas Bayly, 2nd Baronet (1709 – 9 December 1782), was a British landowner and Member of Parliament.

Background and education
Bayly was the eldest son of Sir Edward Bayly, 1st Baronet, and Dorothy, daughter of the Hon. Oliver Lambart. He was educated at Trinity College, Dublin. He succeeded his father as second Baronet in 1741, inheriting Plas Newydd near Llanfairpwllgwyngyll, Anglesey.

Political career
Bayly was returned to Parliament for Anglesey in 1734, a seat he held until 1741, and again between 1747 and 1761 and 1770 and 1774. In 1761 he was appointed Lord Lieutenant of Anglesey, which he remained until shortly before his death in 1782.

Family
Bayly married firstly Caroline Paget, daughter of Brigadier General Thomas Paget (died 1741), Governor of Menorca, and Mary Whitcombe, in 1737. They had six sons and five daughters: 
 Edward, died unmarried on 30 June 1753
 Henry, who succeeded to the baronetcy
 Nicholas Bayly, who died on 7 June 1812, leaving a widow and ten children
 Thomas, died as an infant
 Brownlow, died as an infant
 Paget Bayly, who was born in 1753 and died 15 November 1804, having married on 25 August 1791 a Miss Colepepper and had issue: an only son, who died 1 November 1801; Louisa Augusta, who married in April 1810 Sir Edward Perrott; and Rose Maria, who married in December 1812 G. A. Coleman
 Mary, who died 20 October 1790, having married Stephen Metcalfe, of Sereby, Lincolnshire
 Dorothy, who died 24 September 1764, having married the Hon. George Forbes.
 Caroline, died in 1786, unmarried
 Gertrude, died in 1761, unmarried
 Louisa, born 4 December 1750, and married 6 April 1789 Captain Thomas Poplett, RN.

After his first wife's death on 7 February 1766, Bayly married secondly Anne (née Hunter). They had a son Lewis Bayly in 1775, Lewis later added the surname Wallis and became a General in the Army. Bayly died in December 1782 and was succeeded in the baronetcy by his eldest son from his first marriage, Henry, who had already succeeded as 10th Baron Paget through his mother in 1769 and was later created Earl of Uxbridge. He was the father of Henry Paget, 1st Marquess of Anglesey, hero of the Battle of Waterloo. Lady Bayly died in May 1818.

References

1709 births
1782 deaths
Alumni of Trinity College Dublin
Baronets in the Baronetage of Ireland
British MPs 1734–1741
British MPs 1747–1754
British MPs 1768–1774
British MPs 1754–1761
Lord-Lieutenants of Anglesey
Members of the Parliament of Great Britain for Welsh constituencies
Nicholas